Anerpa is a genus of longhorn beetles of the subfamily Lamiinae, containing the following species:

 Anerpa carinulata Gahan, 1907
 Anerpa steinkae Hüdepohl, 1990

References

Morimopsini
Cerambycidae genera